Petteri Johannes Koponen (born 13 April 1988) is a Finnish former professional basketball player. He was drafted as the 30th pick by the Philadelphia 76ers in the 2007 NBA draft, and his NBA rights are currently held by the Dallas Mavericks.

Professional career

Tapiolan Honka (2004–2008)
His first club was Malmi Super-Koris ("Malmi super-basketball"), from where he joined one of Finland's top clubs, Espoo Honka in 2004–05 season. Under the guidance of coach Mihailo Pavićević he quickly developed into a key component of Honka's 2006–07 Finnish League championship-winning side. During the 2006–07 campaign Koponen averaged 12.4 points, 2.4 rebounds and 3.7 assists per game. The number of assists may sound small, but in Finland assists are harder to come by than in the NBA because of the difference in FIBA rules, and the league leader had an average of only 5 assists.

Koponen played in the World All-Star team at the Nike Hoop Summit in 2007. He recorded 7 points and 6 assists with only one turnover, playing against future NBA super star, MVP Derrick Rose.

Koponen began his mandatory military service in the Lahti Military Academy in October 2007, participating in a special military service built for professional athletes such as Finnish tennis player Jarkko Nieminen. The Finnish League 2007–08 season began slowly, with Koponen trying to adapt to the military recruit training. Koponen struggled a lot in the opening month of the season, but found his rhythm in November, recording 21.4 points, 4.1 assists, 3.9 rebounds and 2.1 steals a game while draining 55.6% of his 2-point attempts, 45.8% of his 3-point attempts and 81.0% of his free throws. In the first game of December, Koponen played through a concussion and led the Honka Playboys to an overtime victory over Team Componenta, scoring 32 points, grabbing six rebounds and dishing out five assists. After the game, the concussion forced Koponen to be sidelined for a week.

On 14 July 2008, in the NBA Summer League game against the Washington Wizards, Koponen scored 19 points, shooting 4-for-6 on three-point attempts.

Virtus Bologna (2008–2012)
In August 2008 he signed a four-year deal with the Italian team Virtus Bologna.

Khimki (2012–2016)
On 31 May 2012, he signed a three-year contract with the Russian team Khimki. On 27 March 2015, he re-signed with Khimki for two more years. With Khimki he won the 2014–15 EuroCup season, and was also named to the All-EuroCup First Team.

Barcelona (2016–2018)
On 16 August 2016, Koponen signed a three-year contract with Spanish powerhouse Barcelona. One month later, he would suffer a traffic accident that caused him a head injury. On 29 June 2018 Barcelona part ways with him.

Bayern Munich (2018–2020)
On 24 July 2018, Koponen signed a three-year contract with Bayern Munich of the German Basketball Bundesliga (BBL).

Pallacanestro Reggiana (2021)
On 12 January 2021 he signed with Pallacanestro Reggiana of the Italian Lega Basket Serie A (LBA).

Helsinki Seagulls (2021–present)
On 13 August 2021 Koponen returned to Finland in the Korisliiga, signing for Helsinki Seagulls.

NBA draft rights
On 28 June 2007, Koponen was taken 30th overall in the 2007 NBA draft by the Philadelphia 76ers. He was the final first-round pick in the draft. Philadelphia then traded Koponen to the Portland Trail Blazers in exchange for their number 42 pick, Vanderbilt University swingman Derrick Byars, and cash considerations. On 23 June 2011, Koponen's rights were traded to the Dallas Mavericks for the Mavericks' second round pick in the 2011 draft (57).

National team career
The summer of 2006 was Koponen's coming-out party. First, he played very well in the FIBA Europe Under-20 Championship B-level competition, leading the Finnish team to third place by losing just one game. After that he was promoted to the senior men's Finnish national team. He showed no fear as he played like a veteran and got to play quite a lot. His best game was against the small country Luxembourg national basketball team; he scored 19 points and handed out 7 assists.

Koponen was a main contributor in the Finnish men's national team in the summer of 2007. Finland earned a spot in European Division A after crushing the Romanian national basketball team in a deciding game by a score of 111–61. Koponen averaged 10.6 points, 2.7 assists, 1.7 rebounds and 1.3 steals in 21.3 minutes a game with the national team. Just days before the national team campaign tipped off, Koponen announced he would return to the Honka Playboys for one more season.

Career statistics

EuroLeague

|-
| style="text-align:left;"|2012–13
| style="text-align:left;" rowspan=2|Khimki
| 21 || 5 || 16.2 || .465 || .429 || .957 || 1.0 || 2.1 || .1 || .1 || 6.5 || 6.6
|-
| style="text-align:left;"|2015–16
| 24 || 7 || 19.5 || .426 || .381 || .879 || 1.6 || 2.3 || .5 || .0 || 8.5 || 7.8
|-
| style="text-align:left;"|2016–17
| style="text-align:left;" rowspan=2|Barcelona
| 27 || 3 || 22.6 || .429 || .462 || .915 || 1.7 || 1.9 || .7 || .0 || 10.1 || 8.9
|-
| style="text-align:left;"|2017–18
| 29 || 9 || 20.2 || .491 || .511 || .938 || 1.6 || 1.5 || .5 || .0 || 7.9 || 7.3
|-
| style="text-align:left;"|2018–19
| style="text-align:left;"|Bayern
| 30 || 3 || 18.3 || .516 || .468 || .923 || 1.6 || 1.9 || .3 || .0 || 9.0 || 8.8
|- class="sortbottom"
| style="text-align:center;" colspan=2|Career
| 131 || 27 || 19.5 || .465 || .455 || .917 || 1.5 || 1.9 || .4 || .0 || 7.6 || 8.2

References

External links

 Peterri Koponen at acb.com 
 Petteri Koponen at euroleague.net
 Petteri Koponen at draftexpress.com
 Petteri Koponen at fiba.com
 Petteri Koponen at legabasket.it 
 

1988 births
Living people
2014 FIBA Basketball World Cup players
BC Khimki players
Espoon Honka players
FC Bayern Munich basketball players
Finnish expatriate basketball people in Germany
Finnish expatriate basketball people in Italy
Finnish expatriate basketball people in Russia
Finnish expatriate basketball people in Spain
Finnish expatriate basketball people in the United States
Finnish men's basketball players
Lega Basket Serie A players
Liga ACB players
Philadelphia 76ers draft picks
Point guards
Shooting guards
Sportspeople from Helsinki
Virtus Bologna players